The Ithai Barrage impounds the Manipur River just below the confluence of the Imphal River and the Tuitha River. It is part of the Loktak Hydroelectric project.

References 

Dams on the Manipur River
Barrages in India